Jacob Spon (or Jacques; in English dictionaries given as James) (1647 in Lyon –  25 December 1685, in Vevey, Switzerland) was a French doctor and archaeologist, was a pioneer in the exploration of the monuments of Greece, and a scholar of international reputation in the developing "Republic of Letters".

Biography 
His father was Charles Spon, a doctor and Hellenist, of a wealthy and cultured Calvinist banking family  from Ulm that had been established since 1551 at Lyon, where they were members of the bourgeois élite. Following medical studies at Strasbourg, the younger Spon first met the son of a friend of his father, Charles Patin, who introduced him to antiquarian interests and the study of numismatics, then as now a window into the world of Classical Antiquity. In Paris, Jacob Spon lodged with Patin's father, Guy Patin. At Montpellier he received his doctorate in medicine (1668) and subsequently practiced in Lyon to a wealthy clientele. There his first publication appeared, a Recherche des antiquités et curiosités de la ville de Lyon and he entered into correspondence with a wider circle of savants: the abbé Claude Nicaise at Dijon, du Cange at Paris, the erudite circles that gravitated to le Grand Dauphin and the duc d'Aumont. Among his correspondents were the courtier-theologian Jacques-Bénigne Bossuet, the philosopher Pierre Bayle, Pierre Carcavy, the Jesuit scholar François d'Aix de la Chaise, confessor to the King, and François Charpentier. He met Jean Mabillon when Mabillon passed through Lyon in 1682.

Spon traveled to Italy, and then to Greece, to Constantinople and the Levant in 1675–1676 in the company of the English connoisseur and botanist Sir George Wheler (1650–1723), whose collection of antiquities was afterwards bequeathed to Oxford University. They were among the first knowledgeable Western European antiquaries to see the antiquities of Greece at first hand. Spon's Voyage d'Italie, de Dalmatie, de Grèce et du Levant (1678) remained a useful reference work even in the time of Chateaubriand, who employed it on his trip to the East.

Spon brought back many valuable treasures, coins, inscriptions and manuscripts. In January 1680, he quarrelled with Père de La Chaise, who pressed him to convert to Catholicism. That year Spon published his Histoire de la république de Genève, followed by his Récherches curieuses d'antiquité (Lyon 1683) and in 1685 a collection of transcriptions of Roman inscriptions gleaned over the years, Miscellanea eruditae antiquitatis, in the preface to which he offered one of the earliest definitions of "archaeologia" to describe the study of antiquities in which he was engaged.

In 1681 Spon published a brief (95pp.) treatise on fevers, which, being well-received, he expanded to 264 pp. to include the latest remedies, including "Quinquina" from "Perou," which he considers especially effective, but which, he says, the "Ameriquains" did not recognize: "le quinquina n'etoit pas connu pour la guerison des fievres par les Ameriquains meme...".  "Observations sur les Fievres et les Febrifuges" was published by Thomas Amaulry at Lyon in 1684 and posthumously in 1687.  Spon points out that he is an expert on fevers because Lyon includes a swampy area (the Dombes) that produces "mauvais air" responsible for fevers—probably actually malaria.  As Spon's book illustrates, in the 17th century a whole range of diseases were classified as different "fevers."  In its time, "Observations sur les Fievres" was a learned, technical manual for a physician who wanted to be current.
     
The Revocation of the Edict of Nantes, October 1685, was indirectly the cause of Spon's death. Rather than abjure his Calvinist faith, he preferred to leave for Zurich, an illegal move. His money and baggage were stolen from him, and in fragile health, he died of tuberculosis in the canton hospital at Vevey, Christmas Day 1685, at the age of 38.

Works 

 Histoire de la ville et de l'Estat de Genève, Lyon, 1620, ibid., Amaulry, 1680, 1682, Utrecht : Halma, 1685
 The history of the city and state of Geneva, London : White, 1687
 Historie van de Stad en Staat van Geneve, Amsterdam : Oossaan, 1688
 Histoire de Genève rectifiée et augmentée, Genève : Fabri et Barrillot, 1730
 De l'origine des estrenes, [Lyon], 1673, Paris : Didot et de Bure, 1781
 Recherche des antiquités et curiosités de la ville de Lyon, Lyon, 1673
 Relation de l'état présent de la ville d'Athènes, Lyon, 1674
 Réponse à la critique publiée par M. de Guillet sur le Voyage de Grèce, Lyon, 1679
 Ignotorum atque obscurorum quorundam deorum arae, Lugduni : Faeton, 1676
 Voyage d'Italie, de Dalmatie, de Grèce et du Levant, Lyon : Cellier, 1678, Amsterdam : Boom, 1679
 Viaggi per la Dalmazia, Grecia, e Levante, Bologna : Monti, 1688
 Italiänische, Dalmatische, Griechische und Orientalische Reise-Beschreibung, Nürnberg : Hofmann, 1690, 1713
 Lettres sur l'antiquité de la véritable religion, Lausanne : [Gentil ?], 1681
 Lettres curieuses touchant la religion, Cologne, 1682
 Recherches curieuses d'antiquité, Lyon : Amaulry, 1683
 Miscellanea eruditae antiquitatis, Lugduni : [l'auteur], 1685
 Observations sur les fievres et les febrifuges, Lyon : Amaulry, 1684, 1687
 Novi tractatus de potu caphé, de Chinensium thé et de chocolata, Genavæ : Cramer et Perachon, 1699

References 

"The Landscape of Antiquity" 

Physicians from Lyon
1647 births
1685 deaths
Archaeologists from Lyon
Classical archaeologists
17th-century French historians
French epigraphers
17th-century antiquarians
Travelers in Asia Minor